Verkhnyaya Salayevka (Ürge Säläy) is a rural locality (a village) in Badryashevsky Selsoviet, Tatyshlinsky District, Bashkortostan, Russia. The population was 3 as of 2010. There is 1 street.

Geography 
Verkhnyaya Salayevka is located 13 km northeast of Verkhniye Tatyshly (the district's administrative centre) by road. Yuda is the nearest rural locality.

References 

Rural localities in Tatyshlinsky District